Community Weeklies Inc., based in Woburn, Massachusetts, United States, founded three weekly newspapers in the suburbs north of Boston before being bought by Fidelity Investments in 1994 and dissolved into Community Newspaper Company two years later.

The company was founded by developer William S. Cummings of Winchester, the largest property owner in Woburn, to compete with the Daily Times Chronicle and a supposedly "anti-business" local political scene.

History 
After years of complaining about the quality of the local daily and criticizing local politics—including several guest columns in the Daily Times—Cummings in 1991 envisioned starting a monthly newspaper to offer "an alternative voice" in Woburn. He found an advertising base willing to support a weekly, however, so in October 1991 he debuted his free weekly, explaining:

Nevertheless, Cummings' status as Woburn's largest landowner, and landlord at its largest office parks, opened the paper to the impression that its editorials and business coverage were simply mouthpieces for Cummings Properties, a charge Cummings denied.

The Woburn paper's coverage of Stoneham and Winchester—neighboring towns to Woburn—proved so successful that Cummings established new weeklies for those towns in 1994. Upon the debut of the Winchester Town Crier, Cummings detailed his formula: Emphasis on features and sports, with less coverage of local government than his competitors.

Later that year, however, Cummings decided to sell his three-paper chain to Fidelity Investments, parent of Community Newspaper Company, the largest publisher of weeklies in Massachusetts.

Community Weeklies was dissolved in early 1996, when CNC realigned its operating units by geography, assigning the papers to its new Northwest Unit.

Properties 
At the time of its sale to CNC, Community Weeklies consisted of the following weeklies:
 Stoneham Sun of Stoneham (founded 1994)
 Winchester Town Crier of Winchester (founded 1994)
 Woburn Advocate of Woburn (founded 1991)

The Winchester paper was folded into CNC's The Winchester Star, a decades-old weekly. The Advocate is in the Northwest Unit; the Stoneham paper, originally grouped in Northwest, is now part of CNC's North Unit.

References

Mass media in Middlesex County, Massachusetts
Newspapers published in Massachusetts
Defunct newspaper companies of the United States
Defunct companies based in Massachusetts